Confederate Soldiers and Sailors Monument may refer to

 Confederate Soldiers and Sailors Monument (Baltimore)
 Confederate Soldiers and Sailors Monument (Birmingham, Alabama)
 Confederate Soldiers and Sailors Monument (Georgetown, Texas)
 Confederate Soldiers and Sailors Monument (Indianapolis)